The New Democratic Party (NDP) was a South Korean opposition party that existed from 1967 to 1980, when it was forcibly dissolved by the ninth amendment of the constitution promulgated by Chun Doo-hwan the same year. It was the main opposition party during the Park Chung-hee dictatorial regime, and especially since 1972, when the Yushin constitution was put into effect.

Timeline of the party
 7 February 1967 – founded as a coalition of the parties opposing the Park regime – that is, the New Korea Party led by former President Yun Bo-seon and Populist Party led by Park Sun-cheon.
 21 February 1967 – officially registered.
 8 September 1969 – internal party crisis, as there is no consensus about the amendment of the constitution to allow Park Chung-hee run for a third reelection.
 21 September 1969 – the party is again registered.
 26 January 1970 – the Liberal Party representatives join the NDP.
 3 February 1970 – the independents in the National Assembly of South Korea join the NDP to strengthen the opposition.
 March 1971 – the party unanimously elects Kim Dae-jung as candidate in the presidential election.
 1973-1979 – Kim Young-sam as New Democratic Party leader in the National Assembly
 27 October 1980 – the party is dissolved by the transitory dispositions of the Constitution of the Fifth Republic of South Korea.

Election results

President

Legislature

See also
Democratic Party (South Korea, 2008)
Democratic Party (South Korea, 2011)
New Politics Alliance for Democracy

Notes

References

Banned political parties in South Korea
Fourth Republic of Korea
Classical liberal parties
Democratic parties in South Korea
Liberal conservative parties
Korean nationalist parties
Political parties established in 1963
Political parties disestablished in 1980
Defunct political parties in South Korea